Mary Mayhew (born 1965) is an American lobbyist, former Maine commissioner of Health and Human Services and candidate for Governor of Maine in 2018. A lobbyist for hospitals prior to her appointment as Commissioner by Republican Governor Paul LePage, Mayhew spent more than 6 years pursuing conservative welfare policies.

Early life and career
Mayhew grew up in Pittsfield, Maine. Her mother worked as a nurse's aide, and her father was a foreman at a local manufacturing company. He also was chairman of the school board and a community leader. At 14, her family moved to Arkansas to be near her mother's aging parents.

At 17, she moved to Washington, D.C. to become a Congressional page and finish high school.  Her graduation included a Rose Garden reception with President Ronald Reagan. She then enrolled at the University of Arkansas, earning a bachelor's degree in political science. Her father died when she was 19.

Mayhew served as a legislative assistant in Washington, D.C. for Arkansas Congressman William Alexander and then worked as a manager of state government relations for Equifax Corporation in Atlanta, Georgia. She moved back to Maine in 1990 and served as fellow Pittsfield resident Patrick K. McGowan's congressional campaign manager.

She was a partner in the public affairs firm of Hawkes & Mayhew, based in Augusta. Mayhew then served for 11 years as vice president of the Maine Hospital Association before joining the LePage Administration as Senior Health Policy Advisor. She was later chosen to be the Commissioner of the Department of Health and Human Services. Upon her nomination for the position, she changed her party registration from the Democratic Party to the Republican Party.

2018 campaign

In May 2017, Mayhew resigned from her position in the LePage administration effective immediately. She was strongly praised by Governor Paul LePage upon receipt of her resignation. Two weeks later, Mayhew announced her campaign for the Republican nomination for Governor.

Trump administration and Florida AHCA Secretary
In October 2018, Mary Mayhew was hired by the administration of President Donald Trump to run Medicaid, but she resigned less than three months later for a new post under Florida Governor-elect Ron DeSantis. In a statement, Mayhew said she was "grateful" for the federal job and that the Trump administration's "vision for state flexibility" in the Medicaid program made her want to return to administer programs at the state level. On January 4, 2019, DeSantis tapped Mayhew to be Florida's Chief Medicaid officer. She replaced Justin Senior. On May 1, 2019, she was confirmed by the Florida Senate with a 26–13 vote.

Lobbyist
In September 2020, Mayhew resigned from her position to take a job with the Florida Hospital Association, a lobbying group.

References

1965 births
Living people
People from Pittsfield, Maine
People from China, Maine
Maine Democrats
Florida Republicans
Maine Republicans
Women in Maine politics
LePage Administration cabinet members
American lobbyists